Hrušovany is a municipality and village in Chomutov District in the Ústí nad Labem Region of the Czech Republic. It has about 500 inhabitants.

Administrative parts
Villages of Lažany and Vysočany are administrative parts of Hrušovany.

References

Villages in Chomutov District
Villages in the Ore Mountains